Ana Maria Rey is a Colombian theoretical physicist, professor at University of Colorado at Boulder, a JILA fellow, a fellow at National Institute of Standards and Technology and a fellow of the American Physical Society. Rey was the first Hispanic woman to win the Blavatnik Awards for Young Scientists in 2019.

Education
Rey earned a bachelor's degree in physics at Universidad de los Andes in Bogotá in 1999 with a magna cum laude distinction. She got her Ph.D. in physics at University of Maryland in 2004. She was a postdoctoral researcher at the National Institute of Standards and Technology from 2004 to 2005 in the group of Charles W. Clark. She went on to work as a postdoctoral fellow at the Institute of Theoretical Atomic, Molecular and Optical Physics (ITAMP) at Harvard University from 2005 to 2008.

Research and career 
After her postdoctoral position at ITAMP, she joined the University of Colorado Boulder Physics Department as an assistant research professor and JILA as an associate fellow in 2008. She was promoted to JILA Fellow in 2012 and shifted her position in the department of Physics to adjoint professor in 2017.

Rey is a theoretical quantum physicist who works on ways of developing new techniques for controlling quantum systems and their applications ranging from quantum simulations/information to time and frequency standards. Her research is often directly applicable to state-of-the-art experiments, in particular to atomic clocks, quantum computing, and precision measurements. Her contibution to the understanding out-of-equilibrium quantum phenomena have led to pioneer measurements of quantum information scrambling, and the synthesis of magnetic and topological quantum materials. Her publications have been cited more than 11,000 times as of 2020.

Awards and honours 

 2013 MacArthur Fellowship
 2013 Presidential Early Career Award for Scientists and Engineers
 2013 “Great Minds in STEM” Most Promising Scientist Award
2014 Early Career National Hispanic Scientist of the Year
2014 Maria Goeppert-Mayer Award of the American Physical Society.
 2019 Blavatnik Awards for Young Scientists

Personal life 
On July 29, 2000, Rey got married. Two days later, she immigrated to the United States.

Selected publications 
The most cited publications by Rey to the date are:

 S Trotzky, P Cheinet, S Fölling, M Feld, U Schnorrberger, AM Rey. Time-resolved observation and control of superexchange interactions with ultracold atoms in optical lattices. (2008( Science 319 (5861), 295-299
 AV Gorshkov, M Hermele, V Gurarie, C Xu, PS Julienne, J Ye, P Zoller. Two-orbital SU (N) magnetism with ultracold alkaline-earth atoms. (2010) Nature physics 6 (4), 289-295
 B Yan, SA Moses, B Gadway, JP Covey, KRA Hazzard, AM Rey, DS Jin. Observation of dipolar spin-exchange interactions with lattice-confined polar molecules. (2013) Nature 501 (7468), 521-525
 JG Bohnet, BC Sawyer, JW Britton, ML Wall, AM Rey, M Foss-Feig. Quantum spin dynamics and entanglement generation with hundreds of trapped ions. (2016) Science 352 (6291), 1297-1301
 M Gärttner, JG Bohnet, A Safavi-Naini, ML Wall, JJ Bollinger, AM Rey. Measuring out-of-time-order correlations and multiple quantum spectra in a trapped-ion quantum magnet. (2017) Nature Physics 13 (8), 781-786
 X Zhang, M Bishof, SL Bromley, CV Kraus, MS Safronova, P Zoller. Spectroscopic observation of SU (N)-symmetric interactions in Sr orbital magnetism. (2014) Science 345 (6203), 1467-1473

References

External links
Interview with Ana Maria Rey on La W Radio 
 Curriculum Vitae at JILA

Colombian emigrants to the United States
Living people
People from Bogotá
MacArthur Fellows
Theoretical physicists
Colombian women physicists
1970s births
Harvard University alumni
21st-century physicists
21st-century American scientists
21st-century American women scientists
University System of Maryland alumni
Hispanic and Latino American scientists
Hispanic and Latino American physicists
Fellows of the American Physical Society